The Representation of the People (Ireland) Act 1868 (31 & 32 Vict c 49) was an Act of Parliament in the United Kingdom.

The Act did not alter the overall distribution of parliamentary seats in Ireland. It was originally proposed to merge twelve smaller boroughs into six pairs on the model of Scottish district of burghs and Welsh contributory boroughs, with the freed-up seats being transferred to the six most populous county constituencies.  This was rejected by Parliament, although the act as passed  did alter the boundaries of those parliamentary boroughs which were also municipal boroughs, extending the parliamentary boundary to include all the municipal boundary. Only 11 of Ireland's 33 parliamentary boroughs were municipal boroughs under the Municipal Corporations (Ireland) Act 1840.

See also 

 Reform Acts
 Representation of the People Act

References

Sources

Citations

Further reading
 Representation of the People (Ireland) Bill index of Hansard debate references

Representation of the People Acts
1868 in British law
United Kingdom Acts of Parliament 1868
Acts of the Parliament of the United Kingdom concerning Ireland
1868 in Ireland
Electoral reform in Ireland (1801–1921)